The discography of chinese singer Lu Han consists of two studio albums, two extended plays, two live albums, nine single albums and twenty singles.

Albums

Studio albums

Live albums

Compilation albums

Single albums

Extended plays

Singles

As lead artist

Soundtrack appearances

Collaborations

Other appearances

References

Discographies of Chinese artists